There are several dialects of the Hebrew language, both past and present.

Spoken dialects: 

 Modern Hebrew
 Ashkenazi Hebrew
 Sephardi Hebrew
 Mizrahi Hebrew
 Yemenite Hebrew
 Tiberian Hebrew
 Medieval Hebrew
 Mishnaic Hebrew
 Biblical Hebrew

Written dialects:

 Tiberian vocalization
 Babylonian vocalization
 Palestinian vocalization
 Samaritan Hebrew

dialects